Takk... (Thanks...) is the fourth studio album by the Icelandic post-rock band Sigur Rós, first released in the United States by Geffen Records on 12 September 2005. The album debuted at number 27 on the US Billboard 200, selling 30,000 copies in its first week.

Music and lyrics 
Unlike its predecessor, the album's lyrics are mostly in Icelandic, with occasional elements of Vonlenska ("Hopelandic"), a scat-like form of gibberish. The songs "Andvari", "Gong" and "Mílanó" are sung entirely in Vonlenska. Moreover, the song "Mílanó" was written together with the string quartet Amiina.

Rhythmically, Takk... makes extensive use of changing time signatures. In the track "Andvari" for example, the main melody repeats itself every 27 beats, with stress on beats 1, 5, 9, 11, 16, 20 and 25. This could be rendered as seven bars of 4, 4, 2, 5, 4, 5 and 3 beats respectively. Against this there is a steady counter-rhythm of triple time, which could be rendered as eighteen bars of 3/8 time per 27-beat cycle, also known as a phrase.

Release and promotion 
"Glósóli" and "Sæglópur" were released on 15 and 16 August 2005 as the first and second singles respectively, the former worldwide and the latter only in the United States. "Hoppípolla" was released in the UK on 28 November 2005 as the third single. It peaked at number 24 on the UK Singles Chart in May 2006. All three singles were accompanied by a music video.

1,000 copies of Takk... on vinyl were manufactured and arrived in UK and US stores as of January 2006.  It is composed of a gatefold sleeve housing two 12 inch records, with a single die cut page that houses a 10-inch record with a design by Olivia De Bartha etched on one side.

An extended Sæglópur EP was released, featuring three new songs. The EP also included a DVD with all three music videos.

Critical reception 

Sigur Rós received three awards at the Icelandic Music Awards in 2006: Best Album Design (along with Ísak Winther, Alex Somers and Lukka Sigurðardóttir), Best Alternative Act and Best Rock Album for Takk.... In December 2005, American webzine Somewhere Cold ranked Takk... No. 4 on their 2005 Somewhere Cold Awards Hall of Fame list.

Media usage  
The BBC has frequently used tracks from Takk... in its programmes. "Hoppípolla" was used as the backing music to trailers for the highly acclaimed nature series Planet Earth and for the end credits of Match of the Day broadcasting the FA Cup Final. "Sæglópur" has been used as a backing tune for the BBC's advertising campaign for the 2006 Wimbledon Championships, while snips of "Sæglópur", "Milanó", "Gong", and "Svo hljótt" appeared in Top Gear. "Sæglópur" was also notably used in Ubisoft's Prince of Persia E3 2008 gameplay debut trailer as well as their televised commercials for the game. The FIA also used "Hoppípolla" at the end of their review for the Formula One Season, aired during the 2009 FIA Gala.

"Hoppípolla" has also been used in multiple films such as the end of We Bought a Zoo, the end of Eurovision Song Contest: The Story of Fire Saga, and during the closing credits of Penelope. Instrumental versions of "Hoppípolla" and "Inní mér syngur vitleysingur" (off the band's 2008 album Með suð í eyrum við spilum endalaust) were featured back-to-back during the closing scenes of The Mitchells vs. the Machines.

In 2009, British electronic music artist Chicane produced a progressive trance remix of "Hoppípolla", titled "Poppiholla", which was on rotation on BBC Radio 1's B list in June 2009.

Track listing 

On vinyl, "Milanó" is featured on the single-sided 10" included with the set and is labelled as the final side, effectively moving "Milanó" to the end of the album, after "Heysátan" (indicated by the label which has the album's last tracks on side 2B but features "Milanó" on side 3A. Also on the inside of the sleeve. The track listing has "Milanó" on its original place).

Personnel
Credits adapted from the band's official website.

Sigur Rós
 Sigur Rós – production, composition, cover design
 Jón Þór Birgisson – vocals, guitar
 Kjartan Sveinsson – keyboards
 Georg Hólm – bass guitar
 Orri Páll Dýrason – drums

Additional musicians
Amiina – strings, string arrangement (track 7)
 Kristín Lárusdóttir – cello
 Júlía Mogensen – cello
 Stefanía Ólafsdóttir – violas
 Eyjólfur Bjarni Alfreðsson – violas
 Ingrid Karlsdóttir – violins
 Greta Salóme Stefánsdóttir – violins
 Matthías Stefánsson – violins
 Ólöf Júlía Kjartansdóttir – violins
 Eiríkur Orri Ólafsson – trumpets
 Snorri Sigurðarson – trumpets
 Helgi Hrafn Jónsson – trombones
 Samúel Jón Samúelsson – trombones
 Össur Geirsson – tuba
 Frank Aarnink – percussion
 Álafosskórinn – choir (track 3)

Additional personnel
 Kenneth Vaughan Thomas – engineering, mixing, co-production
 Birgir Jón Birgisson – additional engineering
 Ted Jensen – mastering
 Ísak Winther – cover design
 Alex Somers – cover design
 Lukka Sigurðardóttir – cover design

Charts

Weekly charts

Year-end charts

Certifications and sales

References

External links 
 
 
 

2005 albums
Sigur Rós albums
Albums produced by Ken Thomas (record producer)
Geffen Records albums
EMI Records albums
Icelandic-language albums